Bitter Blood: A True Story of Southern Family Pride, Madness, and Multiple Murder (1988) is a non-fiction crime tragedy written by American author Jerry Bledsoe that reached #1 on the New York Times bestseller list.  Bitter Blood is composed of various newspaper articles (from the Greensboro News and Record) and personal eyewitness accounts of several homicides in 1984 and 1985. The setting for the majority of the book is located in rural North Carolina and, more specifically, in Rockingham County and Guilford County.

In a statement released by Barnes & Noble, Bitter Blood is described as a, “…real-life drama of three wealthy families connected by marriage and murder.  Bledsoe recounts the shocking events, obsessive love, and bitter custody battles which led to the bloody climax that took nine lives.”

Synopsis
Widow Delores Lynch lives in a big house, on a four acre lot. She has a good friend from church, who is perplexed that Dolores does not show up for a regularly planned meal out. When the friend drives to the Lynch house to try to learn what has happened, she finds Delores shot dead in her driveway. Later, daughter Jane Lynch is found, shot dead also, in one of the bedrooms. The crime had occurred several days earlier, and the killer had left behind no cartridge casings or fingerprints. With little in the way of clues for detectives to pursue, they question Delores's son Tom Lynch, who stands to inherit the estate. But Tom is eventually eliminated as a suspect, leaving detectives at a seeming dead end. One detective seeks the advice of a very experienced investigator, who tells him, "That family has a dark cloud in it somewhere. Find the dark cloud, and you've found your killer."

Tom, a dentist, had moved to Albuquerque, with his wife Susie Newsome. Susie's aunt, and namesake Susie Sharp was chief justice of the North Carolina Supreme Court. The author uses the crime story as a motivator to interest the reader in a backstory of the talented Sharp family. Susie Sharp's father James Sharp, after starting a school that achieved success, but then burned down, and going broke trying to sell insurance, had moved to Reidsville, passed the bar and become a prominent local attorney, well known for his spirited defense of the accused. Susie Newsome was the daughter of Florence Sharp Newsome, the younger sister of Susie (the justice).

Susie Newsome did not like Albuquerque, because inter alia folks did not react with stunned recognition at the name of "Sharp." Delores had never taken to Susie, and increasing marital friction had nudged Tom to drift to the more welcoming arms of his dental assistant Cathy, leading to a difficult divorce and custody battle over the couple's two sons.  Tom later remarried to Cathy.

Roughly a year after the murder of Delores Lynch, on May 18, 1985, Susie Newsom’s father Bob, mother Florence, and grandmother Hattie were shot to death in their home in Winston-Salem, North Carolina. Before his murder, Bob had agreed to testify in favor of Tom Lynch at an upcoming custody hearing. Because of this lead, police began to speculate that Susie played a role in the murder of her family.

Indeed, Susie Newsome had formed an intimate relationship with her cousin Fritz Klenner, a habitual liar who started a medical practice in Reidsville, North Carolina, without ever obtaining a medical degree or license.

Susie and Fritz became prime suspects in the murders. By June 1985, investigators had gathered substantial evidence and were about to make an arrest. However, on June 3, Fritz fired on police officers when they attempted to raid his Greensboro apartment, then fled the scene in an SUV with Susie and her two children. Fritz and the police became engaged in a low speed 15-minute police chase. When the SUV was stopped, Klenner opened fire with a machine gun, wounding three officers. Before they could respond in kind, he detonated an explosive charge inside the SUV, killing himself and his three passengers.

Autopsies performed on the children showed that both boys had ingested cyanide and had been shot in the head at close range. Later the authorities determined that Susie Newsom ignited the explosives in the SUV.

Aftermath

In the wake of the deaths on June 3, 1985, forensics analysis began on the bodies of Fritz, Susie, John, and Jim. Both boys were found to have high levels of cyanide in their blood in addition to gunshot wounds to the head. It is assumed that due to the poison both children were unconscious during the police chase, and that either Susie or Fritz fatally shot them just prior to the explosion of the bomb. Susie's body was mangled from the waist down and many pieces of the seat were deeply embedded in her corpse. This led investigators to believe that the bomb was positioned underneath her seat, on the passenger side of Fritz's Blazer. Police officers found Fritz alive among the wreckage; however, he soon died from internal hemorrhaging.

The following day, June 4, the police searched the Klenner household and found numerous firearms, explosives, and prescription drugs. Over 15 guns, 30,000 rounds of ammunition, grenades, illegal military equipment, and a couple of claymores were found at Fritz's house. The police also found a case and a half of dynamite that was stored behind the Klenner residence. It is assumed that the missing half-case of dynamite was the cause of the explosion in the car. Inside Fritz's office, the police found evidence which showed that he was an admirer of Adolf Hitler and an avid supporter of the Ku Klux Klan.

While it is a common belief that Fritz Klenner had the means and the motive to commit the murders, it cannot be proven beyond a ballistics report that linked a bullet found at the scene of the Lynch killings with a gun that Klenner and Susie sold to a North Carolina gun dealer. Susie's role in the murders still remains unknown. The prevailing theories are either that she convinced Klenner to commit the murders on her behalf, and thus had foreknowledge of the crimes; or that she had none, and blindly refused to consider that Klenner was involved, seeing any attempt by the state to investigate his possible role as an unreasonable persecution.

Another figure in the case was Ian Perkins, a 21-year-old neighbor of Klenner's. Ian Perkins knew about Fritz's involvement in the murders of Susie's family, since he had driven Klenner to their homes. Perkins had been told by Klenner that the murders were a CIA operation. In 1985, Perkins went on trial and was sentenced to four months in jail and over five years of probation; he is currently seeking a state pardon. Perkins was spared a life sentence thanks to a note from Fritz Klenner that read, "“I’ll write a paper saying you were not knowingly involved, that you believed you were on a covert mission for the government."  The judge noted Ian's naiveté, gullibility, and immaturity as mitigating factors in his sentencing.

Prior to the murders, in 1981, the SBI (State Bureau of Investigation) was given anonymous information that Fritz Klenner was "a dangerous psychopath who was practicing medicine without a license."  However, no investigation ensued after the discovery of this information. In retrospect, the attorney general of North Carolina, Rufus L. Edmisten, said that this vital piece of information was never brought to his attention. Edmisten later admitted that he wished he had done something about the situation prior to its escalation.

Adaptations
In 1994, a television movie based upon the novel was produced, titled In the Best of Families: Marriage, Pride & Madness, and directed by Jeff Bleckner. In the Best of Families has a runtime of 200 minutes and it was originally released and played on CBS in a two part series on January 16 and 18, 1994. It is re-run on cable under the title Bitter Blood. The story was also adapted for an episode of Southern Fried Homicide on Investigation Discovery.  On June 28, 2015, Snapped: Killer Couples aired an episode about the crime.

See also
Murder of Zachary Turner
Murder of Carol DiMaiti
Powell family murders
Murder of Hannah Clarke

References

1998 non-fiction books
American non-fiction books
Books about North Carolina
Dutton Penguin books
Non-fiction crime books